Ahmed Thoriq (born 4 October 1980) is a Maldivian retired professional footballer, nicknamed "Tom".

Biography
He is from the island of Mahibadhoo in Alif Dhaal Atoll.

International career
His first competitive international tournament was the 2003 South Asian Football Federation Championship held in Bangladesh. He made only one appearance in the competition, by replacing Ali Umar as a substitute in their first match where they won 6–0 to Bhutan. He also was the joint top scorer in the 2005 with the fellow national teammates Ali Ashfaq and Ibrahim Fazeel with 3 goals, and 2009 SAFF Championship with Enamul Haque and Channa Ediri Bandanage by scoring a total of 4 goals.

He officially retired from the national team, on 14 February 2013 with the teammate Assad Abdul Ghanee, after the friendly match played between Pakistan at Rasmee Dhandu Stadium. He was awarded with a "golden plaque" by Football Association of Maldives as recognition of his contribution to the national team.

International goals

Honours

Maldives
 SAFF Championship: 2008

References

External links

New Radiant SC sfdd

1980 births
Living people
Maldivian footballers
Maldives international footballers
New Radiant S.C. players
Association football forwards